Charles Sharpes (born 6 February 1992 in London) is a professional squash player who represents England. He reached a career-high world ranking of World No. 48 in February 2017.

References

External links 
 
 
 

English male squash players
Living people
1992 births